"Too Much Ain't Enough Love" is a song by Australian rock singer, Jimmy Barnes. It was released in October 1987 as the first single from Barnes' 1987 album, Freight Train Heart It was his first Australian No. 1 hit single, while reaching No. 4 on the New Zealand Singles Chart. In the United States it was issued in the following year, which peaked at No. 91 on the Billboard Hot 100 in July 1988. It featured back-up vocals by Venetta Fields (who often performed back-up for both Barnes and John Farnham), as well as Wendy Matthews, who later found acclaim as a solo singer.

Reception
In a Cash Box magazine review, they said "He's been called the Australian Bruce Springsteen, and this great cut proves it. He's got a phenomenal rock voice. Great song".

Track listing
7" single (K-424)
Side A "Too Much Ain't Enough Love" - 3:35
Side B "Do or Die" - 3:47

12" single (X 14519)
Side A "Too Much Ain't Enough Love" - 4:35
Side B1 "Lessons In Love" - 3:43
Side B2 "Working Class Man" (live) - 4:11

Music video
A music video was produced to promote the single. Barnes' wife, Jane Barnes, featured in the video as a mysterious Thai woman.

Charts

Weekly charts

Year-end charts

Cover versions 
In 2012 a cover version of the song was released by Joe Bonamassa on his album Driving Towards the Daylight, with Jimmy Barnes again singing the lead vocals

References

1987 singles
Number-one singles in Australia
1987 songs
Songs written by Jonathan Cain
Mushroom Records singles
Geffen Records singles
Songs written by Neal Schon
Songs written by Randy Jackson
Jimmy Barnes songs
Songs written by Jimmy Barnes